The National Opera Studio in London, England was established in 1977 by the Arts Council as a link between the music colleges and the six main UK opera companies. It was resident at Morley College in Lambeth until 2003, when it gained use for the first time of its own dedicated premises in Chapel Yard, Wandsworth. Former directors are Kathryn Harries, Donald Maxwell, Richard Van Allan, and Michael Langdon, and its Head of Music is Mark Shanahan. It is responsible for the training of approximately twelve singers each academic year, as well as four piano répétiteurs. Its funding comes in part from the six main UK opera companies Royal Opera House, English National Opera, Welsh National Opera, Scottish Opera, Opera North and the Glyndebourne Festival Opera, and it is an Arts Council England National Portfolio Organisation (2018–2022). Representatives from each company sit on the final audition panel for selection of each year's intake. The nine-month course usually includes residencies at three of the national opera companies, as well as opera scenes performances in London throughout the year.

Notable alumni

Peter Auty
Barry Banks
Jeffrey Black
Alfie Boe
Ivor Bolton
Susan Bullock
Alice Coote
Wynne Evans
Richard Farnes
Gerald Finley
Catherine Foster
Lesley Garrett
Lisa Gasteen
Julian Gavin
Carl Gombrich
Susan Gritton
Alison Hagley
Caitlin Hulcup
Buddug Verona James
Philip Joll
Paul Carey Jones
Katarina Karnéus
Marie McLaughlin
Jean Rigby
Kate Royal
Claire Rutter
William Shimell
Hilary Summers
Jeremy Huw Williams

Other notable alumni

Marie Arnet
Clive Bailey
Kim Begley
Matthew Best
Cora Burggraaf
Elizabeth Byrne
Bruno Caproni
Karen Cargill
Ashley Catling
John S. Craven
David Curry
Robert Dean
Imelda Drumm
Adrian Dwyer
Martin Fitzpatrick
Martene Grimson
Jonathan Gunthorpe
Gwyn Hughes-Jones
Thora Ker
Anthony Kraus
Garry Magee
Alastair Miles
Gerald Moore
Robert Murray
Steven Naylor
Steven Page
Joan Rodgers
Peter Rose
Rebecca Von Lipinski
Roland Wood

Notes

References
 Langdon, Michael (1982) Notes From A Low Singer, Julia MacRae Books

External links
 National Opera Studio website

Music schools in London
Performing arts education in London
Opera organizations
Opera companies
Music venues in London